London Bridge bus station serves the London Bridge area of the city of London and is situated at the London Bridge tube and rail station.

There are three stands at the station which are situated on the station forecourt.

London Buses routes 17, 43, 141, 149, 388 and 521 serve the station.

New bus station

A new bus station was built as part of the new Shard London Bridge "Gem" development which was open in 2012.

See also
List of bus and coach stations in London

External links
 Buses from London Bridge - Transport for London
 TeamLondonBridge - Accessibility to London Bridge

References

Bus stations in London